The 1789 Rhode Island gubernatorial election was an uncontested election held on April 1, 1789 to elect the governor of Rhode Island. John Collins, the incumbent governor, was the sole candidate and so won with 100% of the vote.

References

Rhode Island gubernatorial elections
1789 in Rhode Island